Vis-à-Marles is a railway station located in the French commune of Marles-les-Mines (Pas-de-Calais).

The station is served by TER on the line from Saint-Pol-sur-Ternoise to Béthune and Lille-Flandres.

References

Railway stations in Pas-de-Calais